The Memorial University of Newfoundland Botanical Garden is operated by Memorial University of Newfoundland in St. John's, Newfoundland and Labrador. It is located on Mount Scio Road in the suburbs of St. John's, and was founded in 1971 under the supervision of Dr. Bernard Jackson. Originally named the Oxen Pond Botanic Park, the gardens were opened to the public in 1977 and became a not-for-profit organization in 1994. The garden and nature trails were developed to provide a place where people of all ages and depths of interest can learn about the plants and natural environment of Newfoundland.  The official emblem of the garden is the twinflower (Linnaea borealis).

Site
The headquarters building is located on a  site on Mount Scio Road. The main garden area includes a greenhouse (including one on the former Squires property across the street which is now a Heritage Site), an alpine house featuring high latitude plants, rock gardens, peat gardens, a heritage garden and a koi pond. The garden is also a nature reserve, featuring 3.5 km of trails in the surrounding boreal forest. Moose, snowshoe hare, ruffed grouse and other wildlife are frequently observed inside the park boundaries.

Butterflies
Plants producing nectar have been developed to maintain the two species of swallowtail butterflies, three species of whites and sulphur butterflies, five species of woodnymphs, ten species of brush-footed butterflies, four gossamer, and two skipper species that are found within the park. Three known overwintering butterflies stay as adults during the winter in the garden's man-made butterfly houses.  The concept of the butterfly house was designed by the garden's original director, Dr. Bernard Jackson. The three species are known as the green comma, the mourning cloak, and Milbert's tortoiseshell. These butterflies are three of the very few butterflies that hibernate as adults during the winter.

The Friends of MUN Botanical Garden
Members of the Friends of the Garden (FOG)  are individuals and families who support the objectives of the Memorial University Botanical Garden.  Volunteers have assisted the garden since its creation in 1971; the FOG organization formed in 1976 and became a charitable organization in 1977.  In August 2011, the FOG had approximately 500 members.  FOG volunteers provide time and expertise, help to maintain the garden and trails within the park, and support fundraising and other special events.

See also
 List of botanical gardens in Canada

References

External links
 M.U.N. Botanical Garden
 https://www.mun.ca  Memorial University of Newfoundland

Botanical gardens in Canada
Memorial University of Newfoundland